Aditya Dhumal (born 13 July 1994) is an Indian cricketer. He made his first-class debut for Mumbai in the 2016–17 Ranji Trophy on 13 November 2016. He made his Twenty20 debut for Mumbai in the 2016–17 Inter State Twenty-20 Tournament on 30 January 2017. He made his List A debut for Mumbai in the 2016–17 Vijay Hazare Trophy on 25 February 2017.

References

External links
 

1994 births
Living people
Indian cricketers
Mumbai cricketers
Place of birth missing (living people)